The 2005 Country Music Association Award, 39th Annual Ceremony, took place on November 15, 2005 and was the first ceremony to be held at Madison Square Garden in New York City, New York, hosted by Brooks & Dunn. This was the final ceremony to be distributed by CBS, before the ceremonies' switch to ABC.

Winners and Nominees 
Bold denotes the winners

References 

Country Music Association
CMA
Country Music Association Awards
2000s in Manhattan
Country Music Association Awards
November 2005 events in the United States
2005 awards in the United States
Events in New York City
Madison Square Garden